The Théâtre Montparnasse is a theatre at 31, rue de la Gaîté in the 14th arrondissement of Paris.

History
After the death of famed Paris theatre builder and artistic director Henri Larochelle (1826-1884), his widow, along with former actor and artistic director Louis-Hubert Hartmann, built the present structure, which opened on 29 October 1886, on a site that had been dedicated to theatre since 1817. Architect Charles Peigniet, who helped create the pedestal for the Statue of Liberty in New York Bay, designed the new building.

Although the Théâtre Montparnasse began as a commercial playhouse for melodramatic fare, it occasionally leased its stage to new experimentalist plays of the Independent Theatre movement. A year after the theatre's opening, Hartmann readily agreed to lease his stage to André Antoine, whose revolutionary new company, the Théâtre Libre, had, in spring 1887, earned immediate publicity as an exciting venture devoted to producing new plays. He also generously offered his warehouse of scenery and backdrops. Théâtre Montparnasse became the Théâtre Libre's home for the six programmed evenings between November 1887 and June 1888, where it presented fifteen new works of varying quality. The season's most resounding success was the French premiere of Tolstoy's The Power of Darkness on 10 February 1888, which led to a rare sold-out repeat performance eight days later. By contrast, on 16 January 1891, Paul Fort's Théâtre d'Art presented a failed, five-and-a-half-hour production of Shelley's The Cenci in French translation.

From 1930 to 1943, Gaston Baty directed the theatre, and as a result, it became known as the Théâtre Montparnasse-Gaston Baty. From 1944 to 1964, actress Margaret Jamois directed the theatre.

In 1965, Lars Schmidt bought the theatre and appointed Jerome Hullot artistic director. Schmidt and Hullot introduced many English talents to the French stage, including such authors and actors as Harold Pinter, Peter Shaffer, Noël Coward, Arnold Wesker, and Murray Schisgal. In 1979, they created the Petit Montparnasse theatre on the site of a former warehouse.

In 1984, Schmidt retired, and Myriam Colombi succeeded him, renovating the theatre and adding a bar-restaurant. The current capacity of the main theatre is seven hundred and fifteen seats.

In 1998, renovation and expansion of the Petit Montparnasse began, and it became a hall with two hundred seats, finally reopening in November 2003.

The Théâtre Montparnasse-Gaston Baty was designated a historic monument on 3 April 1984.

Productions since 1930

Productions by Gaston Baty

 1930:  The Threepenny Opera by Bertolt Brecht
 1930:  The Doctor in Spite of Himself by Molière
 1930:  Le Sourd ou l'auberge pleine by Pierre-Jean-Baptiste Choudard-Desforges
 1931:  Wasteland by Jean-Victor Pellerin
 1931:  Danube red by Bernard Zimmer
 1932:  Bifur by Simon Gantillon
 1932:  Café-Tabac by Denys Amiel
 1932:  As You Desire Me by Luigi Pirandello
 1933:  Crime and Punishment by Dostoevsky
 1934:  Round trip from Jacques Chabannes
 1934:  Prosper by Lucienne Favre
 1935:  Hotel masks by John Albert
 1935:  Les Caprices de Marianne by Alfred de Musset
 1936:  Madame Bovary by Gustave Flaubert
 1937:  The Failures by Henri-René Lenormand
 1937:  Faust by Goethe
 1937:  Madame Capet by Marcelle Maurette
 1938:  Arden of Feversham by Henri-René Lenormand
 1938:  Dulcinea Gaston Baty
 1939:  Manon Lescaut of Marcelle Maurette by the Abbe Prevost
 1940:  Phèdre by Jean Racine
 1940:  A boy at Very by Eugene Labiche
 1941:  Mary Stuart by Marcelle Maurette
 1941:  The Taming of the Shrew by William Shakespeare
 1942:  Macbeth by William Shakespeare
 1944:  The Grand Poucet by Claude-André Puget
 1944:  Emily Brontë, pièce en 3 actes et 9 tableaux by Simone
 1945:  Lorenzaccio by Alfred de Musset
 1947:  The Love for Three Oranges by Alexandre Arnoux

Productions by Marguerite Jamois

 1943:  Hedda Gabler by Henrik Ibsen
 1946:  Mourning Becomes Electra by Eugene O'Neill
 1949:  Snow by Marcelle Maurette and Georgette Paul
 1951:  Dangerous Liaisons by Pierre Choderlos de Laclos
 1955:  The Teahouse of the August Moon by John Patrick
 1956:  The Diary of Anne Frank by Frances Goodrich and Albert Hackett

References

External links
 
 

Theatres in Paris
Buildings and structures in the 14th arrondissement of Paris
Monuments and memorials in Paris